Kenneth George Kennedy (6 September 1913 – 20 August 1985) was the first Winter Olympian to compete for Australia. He was born in Sydney and was educated at Waverley College was a speed skater and ice hockey player.

Ken Kennedy was the Australian quarter mile and mile champion speed skater for 1931 to 1934, and played interstate ice hockey. In the next two years, he played for the Birmingham, England Maple Leaf ice hockey team.

Kennedy competed in speed skating at the 1936 Winter Olympics at the age of 22. Even though he was the only member of the Australian team, his entry received official backing from the then Australian Olympic Federation, which said:

His best result was 29th in the 500 metres. He had the following to say about the games held in Garmisch-Partenkirchen in Nazi Germany:

The New South Wales Olympic Council reported:

After the Olympics, he turned professional, earning 75 pounds a week in a time in England when "the basic wage was 50 bob" (about two and a half pounds). He featured in ice shows and did barrel jumping.

When World War II broke out, Kennedy joined the Royal Air Force. After the war, he returned to Australia. He played ice hockey in Australia for another six years. He became president of the Australian Ice Hockey Association and the association's delegate to the Australian Olympic Federation, where he argued that overseas trips would be needed for Australia to reach world standard. In the 1980s, he still skated and owned an ice skating equipment shop near Central railway station, Sydney.

References
 Lester, Gary. Australians at the Olympics: A definitive history.  and a list of suspected errata.
 . Retrieved on 2007-08-27.

1913 births
1985 deaths
Australian male speed skaters
Australian ice hockey players
Olympic speed skaters of Australia
Speed skaters at the 1936 Winter Olympics
Sport Australia Hall of Fame inductees
Royal Air Force personnel of World War II
Sportspeople from Sydney
Military personnel from Sydney
Australian expatriate sportspeople in England
Sportsmen from New South Wales